Nilgiri, which literally means "Blue Mountain", may refer to:
 Nilgiri Biosphere Reserve, an International Biosphere Reserve in the Western Ghats and Nilgiri Hills ranges of South India
 Nilgiri mountains, a range of mountains spanning the states of Tamil Nadu and Kerala in Southern India
 Nilgiri Mountain Railway, Tamil Nadu 
 The Nilgiris District, a region of the Indian state of Tamil Nadu
 Nilgiri tea, a dark intensely aromatic and flavourful tea grown around the Nilgiris in Tamil Nadu and Kerala in Southern India
 Nilagiri or Nilgiri, a town in Balasore District of the state of Odisha in East India
 Nilgiri (Odisha Vidhan Sabha constituency), Assembly constituency of Odisha, India
 Nilgiris (supermarket), supermarket chain in South India
 Nilgiri Himal, a range of three peaks in the Annapurna region in Nepal
 INS Nilgiri (F33) class frigate
 Nilgiri, a hill resort in the Bandarban District of Bangladesh